Patricia Ann Shiu is the former Director of Federal Contract Compliance from 2009 to December 1, 2016 during the administration of Barack Obama. Prior to joining the Department of Labor, Shiu worked as Vice President for Programs at the Legal Aid Society-Employment Law Center in San Francisco. She worked there for 26 years. Shiu also worked as an associate at the law firm of Pillsbury, Madison & Sutro.  

In 1982, Shiu received her J.D. from the University of San Francisco School of Law and in 1979, her B.A. in Political Economy of Industrialized States from the University of California, Berkeley. Born in Chicago, she is half Chinese and half Irish, and is the daughter of Joan Pierce Shiu and Mr. Shiu.

Background
As an attorney, Shiu specialized in employment discrimination and family and medical leave cases.  While at the Legal Aid Society, Shiu served as the director of the Society's Work and Family Project. In 1993, Shiu was appointed to the Department of Education’s Civil Rights Reviewing Authority.

Awards and honors

Shiu has been the Treasurer for the Board of the National Employment Lawyers Association; a past president of the California Women Lawyers; a board member for California Rural Legal Assistance, NAPABA, and Asian American Bar Association (AABA). She currently serves as a member of the Grant Advisory Committee of the Impact Fund, which makes grants to support impact litigation for marginalized communities.

She has received numerous honors for her work including the California Women’s Law Center’s 2002 Abby J. Leibman Pursuit of Justice Award and the Pacific Asian American Women Bay Area Coalition’s 2002 Woman Warrior Award. In 2009 she was recognized by the Asian American Law Society with its "Joe Morozumi Lifetime Achievement Award" for her "spirit of uncomprising legal advocacy in matters of conscience."

See also
 List of OFCCP DAS

References

External links
 

1958 births
Living people
University of San Francisco alumni
University of California, Berkeley alumni
California lawyers
United States Department of Labor officials
Obama administration personnel
American people of Chinese descent